Gevers is a Dutch surname that may refer to the following people:
André Gevers (born 1952), Dutch track cyclist 
Daniël Théodore Gevers van Endegeest (1793–1877), Dutch politician
Ernest Gevers (1891–1965), Belgian fencer
Ine Gevers (born 1960), Dutch curator of contemporary art, writer and activist
Marie Gevers (1883–1975), Belgian novelist
Nick Gevers (born 1965), South African science fiction editor and critic
Randy Gevers (born 1981), Dutch motorcycle racer 
Robert Gevers, Belgian field hockey player
T.W. Gevers, South African geologist
Mount Gevers in Antarctica named after T.W. Gevers
Willem Gevers (1911–1994), Dutch nobleman, diplomat and bobsledder

See also
Gever (disambiguation)

Dutch-language surnames